Nicholas Vines (born Sydney, 1976), is an Australian composer currently based in Sydney. He is particularly active at home and in the United States.

Interpreters of Vines’ work range from specialist new music ensembles to high school students. He has received prizes from the US, UK and Poland, as well as Australian honours such as APRA AMCOS Art Music Awards. His compositions are published by Faber Music, Wirripang and the Australian Music Centre. Three albums of his music are available commercially: Torrid Nature Scenes (Stephen Drury & the Callithumpian Consort), Loose, Wet, Perforated (Guerilla Opera) and Hipster Zombies From Mars (Ryan MacEvoy McCullough).

While at the University of Sydney, Vines’s main teachers were Anne Boyd, Peter Sculthorpe and Ross Edwards. He later completed a PhD at Harvard University, studying with Harrison Birtwistle, Bernard Rands, Magnus Lindberg, Julian Anderson, Lee Hyla, Mario Davidovsky, Judith Weir and Michael Finnissy.

Vines actively identifies with transmodernism. His compositional approach is rooted in the technical resources of the Western classical canon, while embracing sounds and ideas from an array of popular, experimental, Australian and non-Western traditions. This combination of rigour and pluralism gives rise to music at once vectored and kaleidoscopic. Vines has worked in both traditional and bespoke forms, producing some eighty-five compositions.  His output includes three operas, a symphony, two string quartets, a piano quartet, and twelve preludes and twenty-one miniatures for piano, as well as many examples of Gebrauchsmusik.  

Vines is also a keen mentor of young composers. From 2007 to 2021, he ran the New Works Program for New England Conservatory’s Summer Institute for Contemporary Performance Practice. His role with the Artology Fanfare Project (2014-21) is well-established and he has been intrinsic to numerous school-based Australian music seminars. Vines currently teaches at Sydney Grammar School as the Senior Master of Academic Extension (Music). One of his initiatives is Composition Club, where he has taught his students about Peter Sculthorpe, video game soundtracks, Shostakovich, and Ava Max.

External links
Nicholas Vines
Australian Music Centre Biography

References
 https://www.australianmusiccentre.com.au/artist/vines-nicholas (accessed 23/12/21)
 https://www.australianmusiccentre.com.au/article/insight-hipster-zombies-from-mars (accessed 23/12/21)

1976 births
21st-century classical composers
Australian classical composers
Australian male classical composers
Harvard University alumni
Harvard University faculty
Living people
21st-century Australian male musicians
21st-century Australian musicians